Sa’ad Makkawi (1916–1985) was an Egyptian writer. He was born in Dalatun, Menoufia. As a young man, he travelled to France to study medicine but he returned without a degree. He is best known for his novel The Sleepwalkers (Al-Sayirun Niyaman) which was chosen by the Arab Writers Union as one of the 100 greatest Arabic novels. The novel has been translated by Jonathan Wright.

References

Egyptian novelists
1916 births
1985 deaths
20th-century novelists
Egyptian expatriates in France